Bhaskargad fort / Basgad Fort is a fort located 48 km from Igatpuri, Nashik district, of Maharashtra. This fort is one of the fort in Trimbak hill range. This fort is near to the Harihar fort.

History
This fort was built during the period of Yadava of Deogiri. It was under the control of Yadavas from 1279 to 1308. It was later under the control of Bahamani Sultanate followed by Nizamshahi of Ahmednagar. In 1629 Shahaji Raje revolted against the Mohammed Adil Shah of Bijapur and the fort was captured by him. This fort was again captured by Adil Shah after the surrender of Shahaji at Mahuli Fort. The fort was under Mughals in 1633. in 1670 the chieftain of King Shivaji, Moropant Pingale, won the fort from Moghuls. In 1688 the fort was again captured by Moghuls. The Koli tribal revolted in 1730 and captured the fort. The fort was under the control of Peshwas till in 1818 when Captain Briggs of East India Company captured it.

How to reach
There are two routes to reach the base village of Dahalepada. One route is from Khodala and the other from Igatpuri. The nearest town is Igatpuri which is 48 km from Nashik and 121 km from Mumbai. The base village of the fort is Dahalepada which is 48 km from Igatpuri. There are hotels at both Igatpuri and Ghoti. The trekking path starts from the hillock south of the Dahlepada. The route is very safe and wide. The trekking route passes through the scrub forest until it reaches an open ridge that is connected to the fort. It takes about an hour to reach the scarp of the hill on which the fort is situated. The route then take a long traverse behind the hillock. There are many overhangs on the scarp. The traverse is very safe and passes through Karvi shrubs till it reaches the rock-cut steps. The climb on the steps is very easy. The parent rock is cut in helical shape and the steps are carved out of it. Half of the path is now covered with boulders and stones. It takes about 15 minutes to reach the top of the fort. The night stay on the fort cannot be made since there is no water and no accommodation facility. It is advised to carry enough water for this trek since there is no water on the route and on the fort.

Places to see
There is one main gate on the main entrance path of the fort. The main entrance gate and the rock-cut steps are carved in the same rock. There is a rock-cut water cistern on the fort. There is a rough idol of Veer Maruti on the fort. It takes about half an hour to visit all places on the fort.

Gallery

See also 
 List of forts in Maharashtra
 List of forts in India

References 

Buildings and structures of the Maratha Empire
Forts in Nashik district
16th-century forts in India